Daniel Alejandro Carrara (born 30 December 1982) is an Argentine footballer.

Career
On 11 August 2009, after a trial period, he signs a contract with Spezia.

References

External links

Argentine footballers
Argentine expatriate footballers
FC Chiasso players
Calcio Lecco 1912 players
Expatriate footballers in Switzerland
Expatriate footballers in Italy
Association football midfielders
Argentine expatriate sportspeople in Italy
Footballers from Córdoba, Argentina
1982 births
Living people
Argentine expatriate sportspeople in Switzerland